The Public Services Commission of Malaysia, abbreviated SPA or PSC, is established by Article 139 of the Constitution of Malaysia. It is responsible for the general administration of the Public Services of Malaysia's Federal Government. It establishes the rules and regulations for the conduct of all members of the Federal civil service. The commission has the authority to appoint and dismiss most members of the services. It gives advice to the King of Malaysia regarding appointments to positions that he has designated as Special posts.  The Chairman and other members of the Commission are appointed by the King of Malaysia at his discretion, as laid down in Article 139(4) of the Federal Constitution.

External links

Federal ministries, departments and agencies of Malaysia
Government agencies established in 1957
1957 establishments in Malaya
Prime Minister's Department (Malaysia)
National civil service commissions